Gahlon is a village of Uttar Pradesh, India with a population of 8-9,000. 40-50% of the village's population are Kanyakubja Brahmins, and as such, it is known as the hub of Kanyakubja Brahmins.

The predominant languages spoken are Hindi, Bhojpuri, Awadhi, and English.

References 

Villages in Kanpur Dehat district